The Holden Brougham is a large, luxury automobile that was produced by Holden in Australia between July 1968 and 1971.

It was based on the mainstream Holden Premier of the same years, but with a lengthened rear body. The boot was simply extended by  rather than increasing the  wheelbase. The Premier's four-headlight grille was also kept. The model was a hasty response to Ford Australia's successful Fairlane.

History 
The HK series Brougham was launched in July 1968 along with the new Monaro coupés, six months after the HK Series Holden Belmont/Kingswood/Premier models. The Brougham then followed the model cycles of these mainstream Holdens: the HT series was announced in July 1969 and the HG series in August 1970.

Because of its luxury positioning, the Brougham was only available with an automatic transmission, first a two-speed, then a three-speed after the HG's launch. The only engine available in the original HK Series Brougham was a Chevrolet  V8. The HT series was launched with the new Holden designed and built 308 cubic inch V8, and was the first Holden to be powered by this engine (the rest of the HT range got the 307 until the 308 was made available across the HT range in September 1969). The 308 was carried over to the HG Series Brougham.

Throughout its production life the Ford Fairlane outsold it by a large margin. The Brougham was replaced by the long-wheelbase Statesman models in 1971, on the redesigned HQ platform.

South Africa 
From 1969 to 1971 the Brougham was marketed in South Africa as the Chevrolet Constantia. In addition to the name change, the Constantia featured a unique grille and had trafficators on the leading edge of the front fenders (as did its little sister, the Chevrolet Kommando). It utilised a 250 cid (4,093 cc) Chevrolet inline-six or, as an option, Chevrolet's  small block V8. Either engine version came equipped with the two-speed "Powerglide" automatic transmission.

Gallery

Notes

References 

Books
 
 
 

Journals

External links 
 Holden HK Brougham sales brochure at www.oldcarbrochures.com
 1969 Chevrolet Constantia sales brochure at www.moby302.co.za

Cars of Australia
Brougham
Cars introduced in 1968
1970s cars